The women's mass start competition at the 2018 European Speed Skating Championships was held on 7 January 2018.

Results
The race was started at 17:44.

References

Women's mass start